Faith-based may refer to:

 Faith-based organization
 Faith-based community organizing
 Faith-based school
 White House Office of Faith-Based and Neighborhood Partnerships
 Faith Based (film), 2020 film from director Vincent Masciale

See also 
 Faith Based Initiative (disambiguation)